Kwame Asante is a Ghanaian soldier and politician. He served in the National Redemption Council military government until his resignation in 1974.

Following the coup d'état on 13 January 1972, he was appointed the Commissioner for Labour, Social welfare and Cooperatives led by Colonel Acheampong. In 1973, he was transferred to the Ministry of Transport which he headed until April 1974 when he resigned from government.

Asante was one of several people whose assets were returned to them during the Kufuor government era. These assets had been seized during the purge by the Armed Forces Revolutionary Council military government led by Flight Lt. Jerry Rawlings when it ruled Ghana for four months in 1979.

Asante had three children with his wife Leticia. He had four additional children with three other women. He died intestate on 3 April 1990 following a road traffic collision.

See also
National Redemption Council

References

  

Year of birth missing
1990 deaths
Ghana Army personnel
Labour ministers of Ghana
Transport ministers of Ghana